Novochurtakh (Altmirz-Yurt) is a rural locality (a selo) in Novolaksky District, Republic of Dagestan, Russia. The population was 3,305 as of 2010. There are 42 streets.

Geography 
Novochurtakh is located 9 km south of Khasavyurt, on the left bank of the Yaryk-su River. Gamiyakh and Arkabash are the nearest rural localities.

Nationalities 
Chechens, Avars and Laks live there.

References 

Rural localities in Novolaksky District